Chahar Borj is a city in West Azerbaijan Province, Iran.

Chahar Borj may also refer to:
 Chahar Borj, Dashtestan, Bushehr province
 Chahar Borj, Ganaveh, Bushehr province
 Chahar Borj, Fars
 Chahar Borj, Isfahan
 Chahar Borj, North Khorasan
 Chahar Borj, Mashhad, Razavi Khorasan province
 Chahar Borj-e Olya
 Chahar Borj-e Sofla
 Chaharborj County, West Azerbaijan province